4 de Julho Esporte Clube, commonly known as 4 de Julho, is a Brazilian football club based in Piripiri, Piauí state. They competed in the Série B once and in the Série C twice.

4 de Julho is the second-best ranked team from Piauí in CBF's national club ranking, behind Altos.

History
The club was founded on 4 July 1987, hence the name 4 de Julho (4 July in English). 4 de Julho won the Campeonato Piauiense in 1992 and in 1993. They competed in the Série B in 1989, when they were eliminated in the First Stage. 4 de Julho was eliminated in the First Stage in the 1993 and in the 1997 editions of the Série C. The club won the Campeonato Piauiense for the third time in 2011, after beating Comercial 1–0 in the first leg of the Final, and a 1–1 draw in the second leg, the games were played respectively on 10 and 17 August.

First team squad

Achievements

 Campeonato Piauiense:
 Winners (4): 1992, 1993, 2011, 2020

Stadium
4 de Julho Esporte Clube play their home games at Estádio Municipal Helvídio Nunes de Barros, nicknamed Arena Colorada. The stadium has a maximum capacity of 4,000 people.

External links
instagram

References

Association football clubs established in 1987
Football clubs in Piauí
1987 establishments in Brazil